Sarah Jean Broadie  (née Waterlow; 3 November 1941 – 8 August 2021) was a British philosopher, a Professor of Moral Philosophy and Wardlaw Professor at the University of St Andrews. Broadie specialised in ancient philosophy, with a particular emphasis on Aristotle and Plato. Her work engages with metaphysics and both ancient and contemporary ethics. She has achieved numerous honours throughout her career as an academic philosopher. Broadie studied Greats at Somerville College, Oxford, graduating in 1960. Previously she has worked at the University of Edinburgh, University of Texas at Austin, Yale, Rutgers, and Princeton.

Awards and honours 
Broadie's first major honour came in 1990 when she was elected as a Fellow of the American Academy of Arts and Sciences. In 2002, she was elected as a Fellow of the Royal Society of Edinburgh. Broadie was invited to give the Nellie Wallace Lectures at the University of Oxford in 2003. Her series was titled, 'Nature and Divinity in the Philosophies of Plato and Aristotle.' In the same year Broadie was also elected as a Fellow of the British Academy. In 2006 Broadie was elected as member of the Academia Europaea. Members of the Academia are nominated by peers and must be eminent scholars in their fields. In 2012 Broadie became the 105th President of the Aristotelian Society, and delivered the Presidential Address titled 'Actual Instead.'

Broadie was an Honorary Fellow of Somerville College, Oxford. She was appointed Officer of the Order of the British Empire (OBE) in the 2019 Birthday Honours for services to classical philosophy.

Books

As Sarah Waterlow
Nature, Change, and Agency in Aristotle's Physics: a philosophical study (Oxford University Press, Oxford, 1984)
Passage and Possibility: a study of Aristotle's modal concepts (Oxford University Press, Oxford, 1984)

As Sarah Broadie
Ethics with Aristotle (Oxford University Press, New York, 1991)
Aristotle's Nicomachean Ethics: Philosophical Introduction and Commentary, with a new translation by Christopher Rowe (Oxford University Press, Oxford, 2002)
Aristotle and Beyond: Essays on Metaphysics and Ethics (Cambridge University Press, Cambridge, 2007)
Nature and Divinity in Plato's Timaeus (Cambridge University Press, Cambridge, 2011)
Plato's Sun-Like Good (Cambridge University Press, Cambridge, 2021)

Personal life 
Sarah Broadie was the daughter of the distinguished physiologist John Waterlow and married the philosopher and author Frederick Broadie in 1984.

References

British philosophers
British women philosophers
Academics of the University of St Andrews
Academics of the University of Edinburgh
Fellows of the Royal Society of Edinburgh
Fellows of the American Academy of Arts and Sciences
Fellows of the British Academy
Fellows of Somerville College, Oxford
Officers of the Order of the British Empire
Alumni of Somerville College, Oxford
1941 births
2021 deaths
Women classical scholars
British classical scholars